Joanna Sutton (born 13 July 1986) is an Australian netball player in the ANZ Championship, playing for the Adelaide Thunderbirds. Sutton previously played for the Sydney Swifts (2006) and the AIS Canberra Darters (2004–05) in the Commonwealth Bank Trophy. She is of Rotuman and Australian parentage. She is the sister of National Rugby League player John Sutton.

Jo Sutton returns home to join the NSW Swifts for the 2012 ANZ Championship.

The former AIS and Australian 21/U representative is a NSW junior having started her netball career with Randwick at the age of seven.

A three-year stint with the Adelaide Thunderbirds (2009 – 2011) saw Jo named in the Diamonds Squad for the first time in her debut ANZ Championship season.

Unfortunately her 2010 season was cut short after rupturing her Achilles tendon in round one, ruling her out for the season and sidelining her for the Thunderbirds premiership tilt. A thorough rehabilitation process saw her make a successful return in 2011, playing 12 games during the season.

Netball Career Highlights
 2009 Australian Diamonds Squad
 Back-to-back premierships with the Sydney Swifts (2006-2007)
 Australian 21/U Squad
 2004 Australian Institute of Sport scholarship recipient

References

1986 births
Living people
Australian netball players
Adelaide Thunderbirds players
Australian people of Rotuman descent
Netball players from Sydney
Sydney Swifts players
Australia international netball players
New South Wales Swifts players
AIS Canberra Darters players
Garville Netball Club players
South Australia state netball league players
New South Wales Institute of Sport netball players